The 1931 Tour de France was the 25th edition of the Tour de France, which took place from 30 June to 26 July.

The race was won by French cyclist Antonin Magne. The sprinters Charles Pélissier and Rafaele di Paco both won five stages.

The cyclists were separated into national teams and touriste-routiers, who were grouped into regional teams. In some stages (2, 3, 4, 6, 7 and 12), the national teams started 10 minutes before the touriste-routiers.

One of these touriste-routiers was Max Bulla. In the second stage, when the touriste-routiers started 10 minutes later than the national teams, Bulla overtook the national teams, won the stage and took the lead, the only time in history that a touriste-routier was leading the Tour de France.

Innovations and changes
In 1931, the touriste-routiers started 10 minutes later than the national teams in some stages (2, 3, 4, 6, and 12).
The number of rest days in the Tour de France was reduced to three.

The time bonus for the winner, which had been used before in the 1924 Tour de France, was reintroduced.

Teams

For the second year, the race was run in the national team format, with six different teams. Belgium, Italy, Germany and France each sent a team with eight cyclists. Australia and Switzerland sent a combined team, each with four cyclists. The last team was the Spanish team, with only one cyclist. In addition, 40 cyclists joined as touriste-routiers.

The French team was favourite, because they had dominated the 1930 Tour. The most competition was expected from the Belgian team, followed by the Italian team.

Race overview

In the early flat stages, the sprinters dominated. In the second stage, Austrian Max Bulla won the stage. He was a touriste-routier, and had started ten minutes later than the A-class cyclists. He became the first, and only, touriste-routier to lead the Tour de France, and as of 2011 is the only Austrian to have led the race. Max Bulla was the only Austrian cyclist to win a stage in the Tour de France until 2005, when Georg Totschnig won the 14th stage.

After the fifth stage, Charles Pélissier and Rafaele di Paco shared the lead, thanks to the time bonus.
After the seventh stage, the race was still completely open: the first 30 cyclists in the general classification were within 10 minutes of each other.

The defending champion, André Leducq, was not in good shape. His teammate Antonin Magne took over the leading role in the French team. In the first mountain stage, Belgian Jef Demuysere was away, with Antonin Magne trying to get him back. After a while, Jef Demuysere flatted, and at that moment Magne passed him. Magne had not seen Demuysere, and still thought he was chasing him. He kept racing as fast as he could, and finished four minutes ahead of Antonio Pesenti. In the next stage, a large group finished together, and Magne was still leading the race with Pesenti as his closest competitor.

In the fourteenth stage, Pesenti was away with two teammates. The French team tried to get them back, but didn't succeed. In the end, Magne chased them by himself, but he could not get back to the Italians. His lead decreased to five minutes.
In the fifteenth stage, the Italians tried it again, but they were reeled back in by Charles Pélissier. Then Jef Demuysere got away, and won the stage with a margin of two minutes on Magne.

Before the penultimate stage, Magne was still leading the race, closely followed by Pesenti. Magne was not sure if he would win the race, because that stage would be over cobbles, on which the Belgian cyclists were considered experts. The night before the stage, Magne could not sleep, and his roommate Leducq suggested that he could read some fan mail. Magne considered reading fan mail before the race was over as giving bad luck, but one oversized letter made him curious. Magne opened it, and read a letter from a fan who claimed that Belgian cyclist Gaston Rebry (who had won the 1931 Paris–Roubaix race over the same cobbles) had written to his mother that he was planning to attack on the penultimate stage, together with Jef Demuysere. Leducq thought the letter was a joke, but Magne did not take the risk and told his teammates to stay close to Rebry and Demuysere.
After 60 km, Rebry and Demuysere took off, and Magne followed them. The Belgians took turns to attack Magne, but they could not get away from him. They finished more than seventeen minutes ahead of Pesenti, which secured the victory for Magne and had Demuysere overtake Pesenti for the second place.

Results

In stages 2, 3, 4, 6, 7 and 12, the national teams started 10 minutes before the touriste-routiers; in all other stages all cyclists started together. The cyclist to reach the finish in the least time was the winner of the stage.
The time that each cyclist required to finish the stage was recorded. For the general classification, these times were added together. If a cyclist had received a time bonus, it was subtracted from this total; all time penalties were added to this total. The cyclist with the least accumulated time was the race leader, identified by the yellow jersey.

The team classification was calculated by adding up the times in the general classification of the three highest ranking cyclists per team; the team with the least time was the winner.

Stage winners

Five stages were won by touriste-routiers: Stages 2, 4, 7, 12 and 17, the highest number of stages ever won by touriste-routiers.

General classification

Team classification

Other classifications
The organisers, from the newspaper l'Auto, named a meilleur grimpeur (best climber), an unofficial precursor to the modern King of the Mountains competition. This award was won by Jef Demuysere.

Aftermath
After the Tour de France was over, the winner Antonin Magne was so tired that he had to rest for several weeks.

Notes

References

Bibliography

External links

 
1931 in road cycling
1931 in French sport
1931
Tour de France
Tour de France